Possession is the debut studio album of GOD, released on 17 April 1992 by Caroline and Virgin Records.

Accolades

Track listing

Personnel
Adapted from the Possession liner notes.

GOD
 Steve Blake – alto saxophone, baritone saxophone, tenor saxophone, didgeridoo
 Justin Broadrick – guitar
 Lou Ciccotelli – drums
 Dave Cochrane – bass guitar
 John Edwards – double bass
 Tim Hodgkinson – alto saxophone, bass clarinet
 Gary Jeff – bass guitar
 Scott Kiehl – drums, percussion, mixing
 Kevin Martin – lead vocals, tenor saxophone, sampler, production, mixing

Additional musicians
 Peter Kraut – piano (4, 5, 7, 8)
 Gary Smith – guitar (8)
 John Zorn – alto saxophone (3, 5, 6), mixing
Production and additional personnel
 Silvia Edin – cover art
 Oz Fritz – mixing
 Steve Lowe – recording
 Imad Mansour – assistant engineering
 Peter Morris – photography
 Howie Weinberg – mastering

Release history

References

External links 
 

1992 debut albums
God (British band) albums
Albums produced by Kevin Martin (British musician)
Caroline Records albums
Virgin Records albums